Bussy is a commune in the Cher department in the Centre-Val de Loire region of France.

Geography

The river Airain flows northwest through the northern part of the commune

Population

Sights
 The church of Saints Peter and Paul, dating from the twelfth century.
 Traces of the 12th-century château.
 A feudal motte.
 Evidence of a Roman road and aqueduct.

See also
Communes of the Cher department

References

Communes of Cher (department)